Petrit Zhubi (born 8 May 1988) is a Swedish footballer of Kosovar Albanian descent who plays for Västra Frölunda IF as a midfielder.

His older brother, Mentor Zhubi, is a former footballer.

References

External links

Petrit Zhubi at Fotbolltransfers

1988 births
Living people
Association football midfielders
Superettan players
Allsvenskan players
IK Oddevold players
FC Trollhättan players
Åtvidabergs FF players
Swedish footballers
Swedish people of Albanian descent
Nest-Sotra Fotball players
Swedish expatriate footballers
Expatriate footballers in Norway
Swedish expatriate sportspeople in Norway